The 2005 Voyageurs Cup was the fourth Voyageurs Cup tournament which was started by the Canadian supporters group The Voyageurs.  The 2005 Edition of the tournament featured  Montreal Impact, Toronto Lynx and Vancouver Whitecaps.  Professional soccer teams in Edmonton and Calgary ceased being operated by the league and folded at the end of the 2004 season respectively.

The 2005 Voyageurs Cup was won by Montreal Impact who captured the competition in a dominant fashion going undefeated and clinching the competition on August 31, 2005 in their third of four matches. Montreal Impact not only dominated their Canadian rivals but also the league winning ten points clear of the nearest opposition although the 2005 USL First Division was not a balanced home and away competition where each team played the others an equal number of times.

Format
Each team played two matches (home and away) against each other team. All of these matches are drawn from the USL First Division 2005 regular season; the final two matches played between each city's team is counted as a Voyageurs Cup 2005 match. In each match, 3 points are awarded for wins (even if it comes in extra time), 1 point is awarded for a draw, and 0 points are awarded for losses (even if it comes in extra time). The four teams are ranked according to the total number of points obtained in all matches.

The team ranked highest after all matches have been played is the champion, and will be awarded the Voyageurs Cup.

Standings

Results by round

Schedule

Champion

Top scorers
Source

References

2005
2005 domestic association football cups
2005 in Canadian soccer